Dangerous Muse was an American electronic rock project founded by songwriter and vocalist, Mike Furey and keyboardist, synthesizer programmer, songwriter, background vocalist Tom Napack.

History
Dangerous Muse formed when Furey and Tom Napack met as students at Fordham University, New York City. Furey, a singer-songwriter trained in piano, wanted to experiment with a more electronic sound and Napack, a musician-programmer, was looking to collaborate with a lyricist. Their first recording, "The Rejection", caught the attention of record mogul Seymour Stein who offered the duo a demo deal with Sire Records and facilitated their signing to Cordless Recordings, a digital imprint of Warner Music Group.  Soon after, the duo signed with former Warner Bros. Records Senior Executive, Craig Kostich of Operational Art, for management.

"The Rejection" was their debut three-song digital EP. A music video for the lead single aired on MTV/Logo Network and in its second week went to #1 on the countdown. This success rallied significant press coverage for the duo. Highlights include the cover of The Advocate's annual music issue, Perez Hilton's popular blog, and the New York Daily News "Year End Ones to Watch." The song "The Rejection " was on the soundtrack for the movie " I Now Pronounce You Chuck and Larry ". They were featured in the H&M Fashion Against Aids annual campaign along with Katy Perry, Yoko Ono, Robyn and other artists to raise awareness of HIV/AIDS. An exclusive t-shirt designed by Dangerous Muse was sold in stores worldwide and online to support the cause. Dangerous Muse was the band on stage for the movie "House of Boys". Tom Napack did remixes for artists such as Adam Lambert, Lady Gaga, Eddie Amador, Crystal Waters, Blush Response and Aesthetic Perfect.

Significant Dangerous Muse performances include direct support for Erasure in The Violet Flame Tour, NewNowNext Awards w/ Lady Gaga (MTV Studios, Times Square), Cornell University and Irving Plaza.

In April 2012, the band officially announced that the keyboardist, Tom Napack, had left Dangerous Muse to begin his own project, Vanity Police. Dangerous Muse currently performs as a 4-piece band consisting of: Mike Furey (lead vocals, piano), Ray Suhy (guitar), Walls O’Mara (bass), and Chris Kling (acoustic/electronic drums) with live video art projections by Mojo Video Tech. Over the last few years, Dangerous Muse has released a series of acclaimed singles and EPs as Furey finished his master's degree in English literature at Fordham University.

In March 2017, the band released their album Electric Eternity.

Discography

LPs

Extended plays

Singles

B-Sides

Music videos

Compilations
I Now Pronounce You Chuck And Larry (soundtrack) (July 20, 2007) "The Rejection"
Asleep By Dawn Magazine Presents: DJ Ferret's Underground Club Mix #3 (October 30, 2007 Dancing Ferret Discs) "Give Me Danger"
I Love Montreal : Mixed By Peter Rauhofer (2007) "Give Me Danger (Peter Rauhofer Reconstruction Dub)"

Dangerous Muse Official Remixes
Tegan And Sara - Back In Your Head (Dangerous Muse Remix)
The Veronicas - Untouched (Napack - Dangerous Muse Remixes)
Alanis Morissette - Not As We (Dangerous Muse Remix)
Lady Gaga - Bad Romance (Dangerous Muse "Match In The Gas Tank" Remix)
Adam Lambert - If I Had You (Dangerous Muse Remix)

References

External links
The official Dangerous Muse site
Brightest Young Things - Dangerous Muse Live at Art After Dark
5 Minutes with Support Act Dangerous Muse on Erasure.com
A Walk in Central Park with Mike Furey
James St. James Announces "Fame Kills" Music Video Release on World of Wonder

LGBT-themed musical groups
Electronic music groups from New York (state)
Warner Music Group artists